Hugh of Rouen may refer to:

Hugh of Champagne, archbishop of Rouen (722–730)
Hugh of Amiens, archbishop of Rouen (1129–1164)

See also
Roman Catholic Archdiocese of Rouen, for other (arch)bishops named Hugh